The 2005 Dublin Women's Soccer League was the 12th season of the women's association football league featuring teams mainly from the Greater Dublin Area. Newly promoted Dublin City University lost all twelve games. This included a 13–0 away defeat against Dundalk City in a game which saw Sonia Hoey score ten goals. Debutant Paula Murray also added a hat-trick. UCD won the title for a third successive season. They also completed a league double after defeating Dundalk City 2–0 in the DWSL Premier Cup final at the AUL Complex. The winning UCD team included Sylvia Gee. Dundalk City won the 2005 FAI Women's Cup, defeating a Peamount United team featuring Katie Taylor 1-0 in the final at Lansdowne Road. Sonia Hoey scored the winner in the 16th minute.

Final table

DWSL Premier Cup

Round 1

Round 2

Quarterfinals

Semi-finals

Final

References

2005
2005–06 domestic women's association football leagues
2004–05 domestic women's association football leagues
2005 in Republic of Ireland association football leagues
1